Henry L. Joy (born November 26, 1933) is an American politician and retired teacher from Maine. Joy is a Republican from Crystal, Maine. He was first elected to the Maine House of Representatives in 1992, which was the 116th Legislature, and served in every consecutive legislature except for the 120th Legislature, when he made an unsuccessful bid for governor of Maine, after which he served as a Selectman for the town of Crystal, and was returned to the 121st Legislature in 2002, re-elected in 2004 and 2006.

In October 1997, Joy announced that he would seek the Maine Republican Party's nomination for governor in 1998. In the June 1998 primary, he finished in 2nd place of 3 candidates, behind James B. Longley, Jr.

Joy's House District included Bancroft, Crystal, Dyer Brook, Haynesville, Hersey, Island Falls, Linneus, Ludlow, Merrill, Mount Chase, New Limerick, Oakfield, Patten, Sherman, Smyrna, Stacyville, Weston and Plantations of Glenwood, Macwahoc, Moro and Reed, plus the unorganized territories of North Penobscot (part, including Herseytown Township) and South Aroostook (including Benedicta, Molunkus and Silver Ridge Townships).

He attended Hillyer College, in Hartford Connecticut, from 1951 to 1953, and received a Bachelor of Science degree from Ricker College in 1963, and a master's degree in education from the University of Maine, at Orono in 1976.

Joy was an educator in Island Falls, Maine from 1963 to 1969 and from 1972 to 1974, Superintendent of Schools, CSD #9, 1976–1981, and a teacher with Maine Administrative School Administrative District #25 (MSAD #25), from 1981 to 1992, after which he retired from teaching.

References

External links
Maine State House: Henry L. Joy
Vote Smart: Representative Henry L. Joy

Living people
1933 births
University of Hartford alumni
People from Aroostook County, Maine
Republican Party members of the Maine House of Representatives
Ricker College alumni
University of Maine alumni
School superintendents in Maine
20th-century American educators
Maine city council members